Spunge (styled as [spunge]) is the fourth studio album from British ska punk band Spunge. It was released on 12 November 2007, although the band had sold the albums on their supporting tour from as early as 25 October 2007. The album features two previously released singles, "One More Go" and the download only single "Backstabber".

Track listing
 "Home Video" - 3:15
 "Dear John" - 3:22
 "Girls" - 3:40
 "Backstabber" - 3:07
 "Cheesy Cheerfull" - 1:55
 "Everyone's Got Something" - 4:27
 "Give Up/Give In" - 3:12
 "One More Go" - 2:54
 "Epic" - 3:53
 "Family Circles" - 2:34
 "Middle Finger Salute" - 3:01
 "Rain Check" - 3:38
 "DSH" - 3:23
 "Why Me" - 3:10

Credits
Alex Copeland - lead vocals
Damon "Des" Robins - lead guitar
Chris "Jarvis" Murphy - bass guitar
Jeremy "Jem" King - drums

Paul "Wol" Gurney also featured in two songs ("One More Go" and "Backstabber")

Spunge - producers
Alex Copeland - cover design
El Chivo - cover art
Dan Spring - producer

2007 albums
Spunge albums